Gazgasak may refer to:
 Gazgasak, Mangur-e Gharbi
 Gazgasak, Piran